Interplay, is an album by jazz pianist Al Haig and bassist Jamil Nasser recorded in 1976 and released on the short-lived Sea Breeze label.

Reception 

The Allmusic review by Ron Wynn states, "Fine duets featuring pianist Al Haig during a busy period in the mid-'70s. He'd overcome personal problems and was cranking out albums left and right ... They are mostly excellent examples of Haig's surging bop style".

Track listing 
 "How Deep Is the Ocean?" (Irving Berlin) – 5:45
 "Passion Flower" (Billy Strayhorn) – 5:26
 "All the Things You Are" (Jerome Kern, Oscar Hammerstein II) – 6:18
 "Warm Valley" (Duke Ellington) – 5:27
 "Milestones" (Miles Davis) – 4:12
 "Prelude to a Kiss" (Ellington, Irving Gordon, Irving Mills) – 5:17
 "Love Walked In" (George Gershwin, Ira Gershwin) – 5:00
 "Star Eyes" (Gene de Paul, Don Raye) – 6:28

Personnel 
Al Haig – piano
Jamil Nasser – bass

References 

Al Haig albums
1976 albums